New Chum is a suburb in the City of Ipswich, Queensland, Australia.

History
The suburb takes its name from the New Chum mine.

Dinosaur fossils 
Underground coal mines were present in the area from the late 1800s to towards the end of the twentieth century. In 1964, dinosaur footprints were discovered from the Rhondda colliery 230 metres below ground along the sandstone ceiling of the Striped Bacon coal seam. These were initially described as Eubrontes, a type of predatory dinosaur (theropod) footprint. Later, these footprints were considered as evidence for the world's largest Triassic theropod, with legs towering over 2 metres tall. A 3D evaluation of the fossil indicated the footprint length was much smaller than previously reported (34 cm rather than 46 cm long) and its shape was characteristic of the trace fossil genus (ichnogenus) Evazoum. The existing hypothesis is that Evazoum were made by prosauropods, ancestral forms of long-necked sauropod dinosaurs. The bipedal dinosaur track-maker may have resembled the dinosaur Plateosaurus, and this fossil is the only evidence of this group of dinosaurs in Australia. The next evidence for sauropodomorphs in Australia comes over 50 million years later in the Jurassic.

References 

Suburbs of Ipswich, Queensland